The  Inca tern (Larosterna inca) is a Near Threatened species of bird in subfamily Sterninae of the family Laridae, the gulls, terns, and skimmers. It is found in Chile, Ecuador, and Peru and has wandered to Central America and Hawaii.

Taxonomy and systematics

The Inca tern is the only member of genus Larosterna and has no subspecies.

Description

Its plumage is unique. Adults have a mostly dark slate gray body with a paler throat and underwing coverts. A white stripe extends back from the base of the bill and fans out as long satiny feathers along the side of the neck. The trailing edge of their wing and the edges of the four outer primaries are white. Their tail is black and moderately forked. Their iris is brown, their legs and feet dark red, and their bill dark red with bare yellow skin at its base. Young are at first purplish brown progressing through brownish gray to adult plumage. Their bill and legs are dark horn-colored and gradually attain the red of adults'.

Distribution and habitat

The Inca tern is a bird of the Humboldt Current region. It breeds from Lobos de Tierra in northern Peru south to the Aconcagua River near Valparaíso, Chile. Some disperse north into Ecuador after breeding. It is a casual visitor to Panama and Costa Rica and has been recorded as a vagrant in Guatemala and Hawaii. The last spent March to November wandering among the islands. Undocumented sight records in Colombia lead the South American Classification Committee of the American Ornithological Society to treat it as hypothetical in that country.

The Inca tern nests on sea cliffs and guano islands and also artificial structures such as ledges under piers and abandoned barges. It will gather with other sea birds on sandy beaches.

Behavior

Movement

The Inca tern is essentially non-migratory, but some do disperse north after breeding and individuals have wandered great distances.

Feeding

The Inca tern feeds primarily on small fish, such as anchoveta (Engraulis ringens) and also includes planktonic crustaceans and offal in its diet. Large flocks attend fishing boats and also follow feeding cormorants, sea lions, and whales and dolphins. Feeding flocks can number 5000 birds. It catches its prey mainly by plunge-diving but also picks items from the surface while flying or on the water.

Breeding

The Inca tern's breeding does not appear to be concentrated in any season. Eggs have been found between April and July and between October and December, and other evidence of breeding has been noted in August. It nests in a variety of sites including fissures and caves in rock cliffs, among rocks and boulders on island slopes, in abandoned petrel and penguin burrows, and on and under human structures. The clutch size is usually two eggs though sometimes one. Both sexes incubate the clutch and provision the young. The incubation period is not known; fledging occurs about four weeks after hatch and the young are fully dependent on the adults for at least a month after fledging.

Vocalization

The Inca tern is most vocal at its nesting colonies. Its calls include "raucous cackling notes" and "mewing"; the latter call has been likened to that of a kitten.

Status

The IUCN has assessed the Inca tern as Near Threatened. It has a somewhat restricted range; its population size is not known and is believed to be decreasing. "Reproductive success is dramatically reduced during El Niño events". Human harvesting of its primary prey is a probable threat as is climate change. One estimate placed its population at about 150,000 in 2011.

References

Inca tern
Birds of Peru
Birds of Chile
Western South American coastal birds
Inca tern
Taxa named by René Lesson